Simba Safari is a 1981 fantasy role-playing game adventure published by Judges Guild for Traveller.

Plot summary
Simba Safari is a hunting adventure, a grand interstellar safari in search of the most dangerous game trophies in the Diamond-Prince subsector of Judges Guild's Ley Sector.

Publication history
Simba Safari was written by Dave Sering and was published in 1981 by Judges Guild as a 32-page book.

Reception
William A. Barton reviewed Simba Safari in The Space Gamer No. 49. Barton commented that "in the hands of the right group of players, this could easily prove the best Traveller adventure JG has published in some time."

Review
Different Worlds #18 (Jan., 1982)
Dragon #63 (July, 1982)

References

Judges Guild publications
Role-playing game supplements introduced in 1981
Traveller (role-playing game) adventures